Longwing may refer to:
Heliconiinae, a subfamily of brush-footed butterflies commonly called the longwings
a class of falcons used in falconry
Longwing brogues, a kind of shoe